George Steinmetz (born 1957) is an American photographer. His work has been featured in The New Yorker, Smithsonian, Time, The New York Times Magazine, and he is a regular contributor to National Geographic.

Early life 
He was born in the neighborhood of Beverly Hills in Los Angeles and graduated from Stanford University with a degree in geophysics in 1979. He began his career in photography after hitchhiking through Africa for 28 months in his twenties.

Career 
He is the author of five books, African Air,  Empty Quarter, Desert Air, New York Air, and The Human Planet: Earth at the Dawn of the Anthropocene which feature portfolios of his work in many regions of the world. African Air is a compilation of pictures from ten years of flying over Africa, mostly with a motorized paraglider. Empty Quarter contains images of the Arabian landscape, its people, and its wildlife. Desert Air is a photographic collection of the world's "extreme deserts", which receive less than four inches of precipitation per year. Included are photographs of the Gobi Desert, the Sahara, and Death Valley. "New York Air" is an aerial portrait of New York City with all its boroughs in all four seasons. The Human Planet: Earth at the Dawn of the Anthropocene chronicles how humans have come to be the dominant force shaping the environment and the solutions people have come up with to protect the planet and combat pollution. Images taken on all seven continents over Steinmetz's thirty years of aerial photography explore climate and the natural world, how humans have harvested the biosphere and the footprint humanity is leaving on the planet. The Human Planet was honored with the Gold award for Best Travel Book in the 2020 - 2021 SATW Foundation Lowell Thomas Travel Journalism Competition.

Since his first assignment for National Geographic in 1987, Steinmetz has completed more than 20 major essays for the magazine, including three covers.

He has received many awards during his multi-decade career in photography, including two first prizes in science and technology from World Press Photo. A recent project on large scale food production won The One Club Gold Cube Award He has also won awards and citations from Pictures of the Year, including the 74th Annual POYi Environmental Vision Award, Overseas Press Club and Life magazine's Alfred Eisenstaedt Awards. In 2006 he was awarded a grant by the National Science Foundation to profit from the work of scientists in the dry valleys and volcanoes of Antarctica. The LOOK3 Festival hosted Steinmetz as a keynote speaker in 2011 for his presentation titled "Wild Air".

Much of his work focuses on photographing the world while piloting a motorized paraglider. This experimental aircraft enables him to capture images of the world inaccessible by traditional aircraft and most other modes of transportation. He began using the paraglider in 1997 when a pilot he had hired for a job in Niger quit. He has also begun using a drone for photography.

In 2003 he was the first person to take pictures from a private aircraft in Iran following the revolution.

There is a selection of his work exclusively represented by Anastasia Photo in NYC. His work has also been exhibited in Dubai, the Brookfield Winter Garden in New York., The Arizona-Sonora Desert Museum, The Konica-Minolta Plaza in Tokyo as well as public venues Houston, Denver, Los Angeles, Toronto, Stuttgart, Expo 2015 in Milano, the Triennale di Milano, and twice in the Festival Photo La Gacilly in France.

There are several videos online that feature Steinmetz and his work. He was featured at TED Global 2017 in Tanzania, where he presented his work on Africa. He was interviewed by the Explorers Club and presented his work at the LOOK3 Festival in Charlottesville, the New England Aquarium, and Harvard University. He has videos to preview his books African Air, Empty Quarter, and Desert Air.

Steinmetz was a National Geographic explorer and wildlife photographer on Welcome to Earth, the Disney+ original series from National Geographic that follows Will Smith on an extraordinary adventure around the world to explore Earth's greatest wonders and reveal its most hidden secrets. Steinmetz appeared in Episode 2: "Descent into Darkness" and Episode 3: "Mind of the Swarm".

Personal 
He lives in Glen Ridge, New Jersey. Steinmetz is married to Lisa Bannon, a writer at the Wall Street Journal. They have three children.

References

Living people
1957 births
People from Beverly Hills, California
Stanford University alumni
American photographers
American male writers
Aerial photographers